In Scottish folklore, sunwise, deosil or sunward (clockwise) was considered the “prosperous course”, turning from east to west in the direction of the sun. The opposite course, anticlockwise, was known as widdershins (Lowland Scots), or tuathal (Scottish Gaelic). In the Northern Hemisphere, "sunwise" and "clockwise" run in the same direction, because sundials were used to tell time, and their features were transferred to clock faces. Another influence may have been the right-handed bias in many cultures.

Irish culture

Before a battle it was customary for a chosen monk or holy man (usually attached to the Clan McGroarty and who was in a state of grace) to wear the Cathach and the cumdach, or book shrine, around his neck and then walk three times sunwise around the warriors of Clan O'Donnell.

According to folklorist Kevin Danaher, on St. John's Eve in Ulster and Connaught, it was customary to light a bonfire at sunset and to walk sunwise around the fire while praying the rosary. Those who could not afford a rosary would keep tally by holding a small pebble during each prayer and throwing it into the bonfire as each prayer was completed.

Scottish culture
This is descriptive of the ceremony observed by the druids, of walking round their temples by the south, in the course of their directions, always keeping their temples on their right. This course (diasil or deiseal) was deemed propitious, while the contrary course is perceived as fatal, or at least unpropitious. From this ancient superstition are derived several Gaelic customs which were still observed around the turn of the twentieth century, such as drinking over the left thumb, as Toland expresses it, or according to the course of the sun.

Martin Martin says:

"Deosil" and other spellings
Wicca uses the spelling deosil, which violates the Gaelic orthography principle that a consonant must be surrounded by either broad vowels (a, o, u) or slender vowels (e, i). The Oxford English Dictionary gives precedence to the spelling "deasil", but also acknowledges "deiseal", "deisal", and "deisul".

Other cultures
This distinction exists in traditional Tibetan religion. Tibetan Buddhists go round their shrines sunwise, but followers of Bonpo go widdershins. The former consider Bonpo to be merely a perversion of their practice, but Bonpo adherents claim that their religion, as the indigenous one of Tibet, was doing this prior to the arrival of Buddhism in the country.

The Hindu pradakshina, the auspicious circumambulation of a temple, is also made clockwise.

A similar preference may inform the left-hand drive found in England, India, and Japan.  Any temple or shrine in the middle of a road must be passed to its left.

See also
Circumambulation

References

Sources
  (Deiseal)

Irish folklore
Irish mythology
Scottish folklore
Tibet
Orientation (geometry)